Joshua Adam O'Keefe (born 22 December 1988) is a footballer who plays as a midfielder for Chorley.

Career

Blackburn Rovers
Born in Whalley, Lancashire, O'Keefe was educated at Queen Elizabeth's Grammar School, Blackburn, where along with Frank Fielding he played in their victorious Boodles ISFA Cup team of 2003–04, defeating Millfield School 5–4 on penalties following a 2–2 draw in the final at the Walkers Stadium, whilst also playing representative football for ISFA. He then joined the Blackburn Rovers academy, making his Premier Academy League debut for the club in the 0–0 draw at Newcastle United on 2 April 2005.

Walsall
He then signed for Walsall on a free transfer and made his debut on 12 September 2009, coming on as a substitute for Richard Taundry, in the Football League One clash with Tranmere Rovers at Prenton Park, which ended in a 3–2 win to Walsall. He was released by Walsall on 10 May 2010 along with six other players.

Lincoln City
O'Keefe was then signed by Lincoln City on 17 May 2010 on a two-year contract. On 3 January 2011, he scored his first ever goal as a professional, scoring an equaliser in the match against Northampton Town. On 26 December 2011 O'Keefe left Lincoln City by mutual consent.

Non-league career
On 1 March 2012, O'Keefe joined Conference Premier team Southport. On 24 September he joined Hereford United. On 11 June 2013 he signed a new one-year contract to remain with the club for the 2013–14 season. On 31 January 2014, he signed an 18-month deal with play off hopefuls Kidderminster Harriers. On 1 September 2014, he moved to Telford United on a month-long loan deal where he made five appearances. On 11 November 2014, he was sent on a two-month loan to Chester having only made one appearance all season for the Harriers. His loan spell, due to end on 1 January 2015, was cut short due to injury. On 12 May 2015, he signed for Altrincham, after being released by Kidderminster having made 20 appearances. In June 2016, he agreed a deal to join Chorley.

International career
On 8 August 2008, he was called up for the Republic of Ireland U21 squad, qualifying by virtue of his father's Irish parents. He made his debut as a second-half substitute in the 1–1 draw with the Austria U21 side on 19 August 2008.

Career statistics

Personal life
In 2018 he graduated from the University of Salford with a first class degree in physiotherapy.

He is married.

References

External links

1988 births
Living people
People from Whalley, Lancashire
English footballers
Republic of Ireland association footballers
Republic of Ireland under-21 international footballers
Association football midfielders
Blackburn Rovers F.C. players
Walsall F.C. players
Lincoln City F.C. players
Southport F.C. players
Hereford United F.C. players
Kidderminster Harriers F.C. players
AFC Telford United players
Chester F.C. players
Altrincham F.C. players
Chorley F.C. players
English Football League players
National League (English football) players
Alumni of the University of Salford